The Mad'arovce culture was an archaeological culture of the Early Bronze Age (c. 1750-1500 BC) located in western Slovakia. It formed part of the broader Mad’arovce-Věteřov-Böheimkirchen cultural complex, also found in Austria and Moravia, which had links with Mycenaean Greece. There was a gradual evolution from the preceding Unetice and Hatvan cultures to the Mad'arovce culture from c. 2000 BC to 1750 BC, and it was succeeded by the Tumulus culture after 1500 BC. The Mad'arovce culture is sometimes considered to be a sub-group in the final Unetice tradition. Important sites include the fortified settlements of Fidvár and Nitriansky Hrádok.

See also 

 Unetice culture
 Bronze Age Britain
 Rhône culture
 Armorican Tumulus culture
 Polada culture
 Ottomány culture
 Wietenberg culture
 Nordic Bronze Age

References 

Archaeological cultures of Central Europe
Bronze Age cultures of Europe
Archaeological cultures in Slovakia
Bronze Age Slovakia